Margaret Fernseed (c. 1560 – 28 February 1608) was an English prostitute, brothel-keeper, and murderer.

According to a pamphlet of 1608, Fernseed confessed to having run a brothel. The pamphlet details the methods by which she recruited prostitutes. Fernseed would "make spoile of young maidens who were sent out of the countrie by their friends with hope to advance themselves". Those girls were then put on the streets and compelled to hand over to Fernseed ten shillings from what they earned. Women who were discontented with their marriages were also targeted by Fernseed: once recruited, they were blackmailed if they refused to sleep with customers.

Fernseed's husband, Anthony, a tailor, was found dead in Peckham Fields near Lambeth, with his throat cut; Fernseed was arrested. She had allegedly previously attempted to murder him with a poisoned broth. No motive is recorded, and Fernseed is documented as having declared her innocence of the murder. Fernseed was convicted of his murder on circumstantial evidence, in no small part due to her poor reputation.

Fernseed was executed at St. George's Fields for the murder of her husband on 28 February 1608.

Notes

Sources
 
 
 
 

1560s births
1608 deaths
English female prostitutes
English brothel owners and madams
People executed by Stuart England
Crime in London
Executed English people
People executed by the Kingdom of England by hanging
Year of birth uncertain
17th-century English businesspeople
17th-century English businesswomen
Mariticides